Holler is a village in the commune of Weiswampach, in northern Luxembourg.  , the village had a population of 93.

Many of the houses in the village were built in the 17th and 18th centuries, and have been restored.

History
Holler was first mentioned in a document dating from the year 893.

Church

Holler is home to a small 12th century Romanesque-Gothic church. It features high Gothic arches, palm vaulting, and frescoes dating from the 14th century.  The church is classified as a historical monument.

Economy
The economy is dominated by agriculture, mostly potatoes.  The seed potatoes are exported as far as Africa.

Footnotes

Weiswampach
Villages in Luxembourg